The Paraguay national tennis team represents Paraguay in Davis Cup tennis competition and are governed by the Asociación Paraguaya de Tenis.

Paraguay currently compete in Group II of the Americas Zone.  They have played in the World Group on seven occasions, reaching the quarter finals four times.

History
Paraguay competed in its first Davis Cup in 1931. Their best result was reaching the World Group quarterfinals on four occasions, 1983–85 and 1987. Three of those ties went down to the deciding rubber.

Last tie
Paraguay lost to Barbados, and Mexico in the 2017 Davis Cup Americas Zone Group II, and was relegated to the 2018 Davis Cup Americas Zone Group III.

Next tie

Paraguay will play in the Group III of the Americas Zone in 2018.

Current team (2022) 

 Daniel Vallejo
 Juan Borba
 Martín Vergara
 Hernando Escurra

See also
Davis Cup
Paraguay Fed Cup team

External links

Davis Cup teams
Davis Cup
Davis Cup